The Mexican woodrat (Neotoma mexicana) is a medium-sized pack rat.

Distribution and habitat
It ranges from the United States (Utah, Colorado, New Mexico and parts of Arizona and Trans-Pecos Texas) south to Honduras. Although occurring at lower elevations during the Pleistocene, it generally is limited now to highlands supporting open coniferous forests or woodlands. In a few places, it occurs in lower country where lava or boulder fields occur; presumably the presence of spaces extending far below the surface enables survival. Like most members of the genus living in rocky areas, dens tend to take advantage of crevices, rock shelters, and caves; stick nests are relatively rare.

Taxonomy
The type locality is near Chihuahua, Mexico. Some 26 species names have been applied to populations of the Mexican woodrat and are now considered synonyms.

Description and diet
The animal averages a bit over 300 mm in total length and weighs 140 to 185 g.  Their diets tend to be generalist, with a wide variety of berries, vegetation, nuts, acorns, and fungi, though foliage seems to make up the major food class.

References

Cornely, J. E., and R. J. Baker. 1986. Neotoma mexicana. Mammalian Species, No. 262:1-7. 
Mexican Woodrat, The Mammals of Texas, online edition - 
Musser, G. G., and M. D. Carleton. 2005. Superfamily Muroidea. pp. 894–1531, in Wilson, D. E., and D. M. Reeder (editors). Mammal Species of the World. A Taxonomic and Geographic Reference (3rd ed), Johns Hopkins University Press, 2,142 pp.

Neotoma
Mammals of Mexico
Mammals of the United States
Mammals described in 1855